Yash Paul Kundal is an Indian politician belonging to Aam Aadmi Party in Jammu and Kashmir. He was the state president of Young Panthers, the youth wing of the Jammu and Kashmir National Panthers Party. He has twice been a Member of the Jammu and Kashmir Legislative Assembly, and was the Minister of Animal and Sheep Husbandry from 2002 to 2008. On 8 April 2022, he joined Aam Admi Party.

Early life 
Kundall graduated from Jammu University in 1997.

Career 
Kundal has won two elections for the Jammu and Kashmir Legislative Assembly in Samba, Jammu. After the 2002 Jammu and Kashmir general elections, he served as the Minister of Animal and Sheep Husbandry in the government. After his second election victory in 2008 Jammu and Kashmir elections he was part of the opposition.

In November 2014, he was appointed as the state president of Young Panthers.

As a MLA he supported the Indian Border Security Force's tree planting drive, being their chief guest and planting the first tree in his constituency of Samba. The BSF went on to plant 200,000 saplings.

Kundal, with Harsh Dev Singh, led protests in Jammu on 18 September 2016 against Pakistan after the 2016 Uri attack on an Indian army base, accusing Pakistan of supporting the terrorist attacks.

In October 2016, he accused the police of not pressing appropriate charges against BJP workers who brutally assaulted Bishan Dass, a scheduled caste youth, at Ramnagar Temple. He wanted the case to be registered as attempted murder. He alleged that hate crimes against scheduled caste members had risen in the area as a consequence of recent BJP electoral victories, saying that seven unexplained deaths of scheduled caste members had gone unsolved in the area over a period of 18 months. Previously, in the December 2014 Jammu and Kashmir general elections, he had lost his seat to a BJP candidate.

In February 2020, Kundul was named as the Chairman of the National Panthers Party Working Committee.

References 

21st-century Indian politicians
University of Jammu alumni
Jammu and Kashmir MLAs 2002–2008
Jammu and Kashmir MLAs 2008–2014
Jammu and Kashmir National Panthers Party politicians
Aam Aadmi Party politicians